Kakhidze is a Georgian surname. Notable people with the surname include:
Aleksandr Kakhidze (bornl 1999), Russian-Georgian football player
Aslan Kakhidze (born 1988), Kazakhstani freestyle wrestler
Jansug Kakhidze (1935—2002), Georgian musician, composer, singer and conductor 
Marine Kakhidze (born 1983), Georgian footballer
Otar Kakhidze (born 1983), Georgian politician and lawyer
Vakhtang Kakhidze (born 1959), Georgian composer and conductor

Surnames of Georgian origin
Georgian-language surnames